MR3 or MR-3 may refer to:
 MegaRace 3, a 2002 video game
 Mercury-Redstone 3, the first American human spaceflight
 Monster Rancher 3, a 2001 video game
 MR3 road, a major highway of Eswatini